Franz Gruber may refer to:

Franz Xaver Gruber (1787–1863), Austrian composer, organist, and creator of the Christmas carol Silent Night
Franz Gruber (actor)
Franz Gruber (alpine skier) (born 1959), Austrian alpine skier
Franz Gruber (tenor), German opera singer